Sitapur Ki Geeta is a 1987 Hindi movie which stars Hema Malini, Rajesh Khanna and Pran. The music of the film was composed by the duo Sonik Omi. The movie, set against a rural backdrop, was most successful in the North and the East of India. Lachak Lachak Lachak Jaye Jawani  is the most famous song from this film, sung by Amit Kumar and Asha Bhosle.   Rajesh Khanna makes special appearance in the film as the presumably intended groom of Hema Malini. The film was dubbed into Bhojpuri and  re-released in 2006.

Cast
Rajesh Khanna as Ramu
Hema Malini as Geeta Singh
Pran as Dharam Singh "Dharma"
Rajan Sippy as Inspector Karan Singh 
Shoma Anand as Pinky Shrivastav
Raza Murad as Thakur Vikram Singh
Shakti Kapoor as Thakur Bahadur Singh
Amjad Khan as Thakur Pratap Singh
Tej Sapru as Teju
Chandrashekhar as Bandit who supported Geeta
Om Shivpuri as IG Shrivastav
Yunus Parvez as Pratap Singh's Munim
Jayshree T. as Courtesan
Chand Usmani as Mrs. Yashoda Singh
Jankidas as Bread Man

Soundtrack
The film's music was composed by the duo Sonik Omi and the songs were written by lyricist Varma Malik.

References

External links 
 

1987 films
1980s Hindi-language films
Films scored by Sonik-Omi
Films directed by Shibu Mitra